Moisés Villarroel may refer to:

 Moisés Villarroel (Chilean footballer) (born 1976), Chilean football manager and former midfielder
 Moisés Villarroel (Bolivian footballer) (born 1998), Bolivian football midfielder